"It Was" is a song written by Mark Wright and Gary Burr, and recorded by American country music artist Chely Wright.  It was released in September 1999 as the second single from her album Single White Female.  The song reached number 11 on the Billboard Hot Country Singles & Tracks chart in April 2000.

Critical reception
Deborah Evans Price of Billboard gave the song a favorable review, saying that it "has a hauntingly beautiful melody and affecting lyric about the mercurial nature of love" and that "Wright possesses a strong voice, full of emotional depth and presence."

Music video
The music video was directed by Deaton-Flanigen Productions and premiered in August 1999.

Chart performance

Year-end charts

References

1999 singles
1999 songs
Chely Wright songs
Songs written by Mark Wright (record producer)
Songs written by Gary Burr
Song recordings produced by Tony Brown (record producer)
Song recordings produced by Buddy Cannon
Song recordings produced by Norro Wilson
MCA Records singles
Music videos directed by Deaton-Flanigen Productions